The timeline of physical chemistry lists the sequence of physical chemistry theories and discoveries in chronological order.

Timeline details

See also
 Timeline of physics
 Timeline of atomic and subatomic physics
 Timeline of chemistry

References

Further reading
 Pais, Abraham ; Inward Bound – Of Matter & Forces in the Physical World, Oxford University Press (1986)  Written by a former Einstein assistant at Princeton, this is a beautiful detailed history of modern fundamental physics, from 1895 (discovery of X-rays) to 1983 (discovery of vectors bosons at C.E.R.N.)
 Richard Feynman; Lecture Notes in Physics. Princeton University Press: Princeton, (1986)
 A. Abragam and B. Bleaney. 1970. Electron Parmagnetic Resonance of Transition Ions, Oxford University Press: Oxford, UK, pp. 911

Physics timelines
Chemistry timelines